The Wilaya of Béni Abbas is an Algerian Province created in 2019, previously, a delegated wilaya created in 2015. It is in the Algerian Sahara.

Geography 
The wilaya of Béni Abbès is in the Algerian Sahara; its area is 101,350 km².

It is delimited:

 to the north by the Bechar Province and Morocco;
 to the east by the Timimoun Province;
 to the west by the Tindouf Province;
 and to the south by the Tindouf Province and Adrar Province.

The greater part of the province is uninhabitable sand dune fields (ergs), in particular the Great Western Erg and the Erg Er Raoui, or dry plains (hamadas) suitable for grazing but with insufficient surface water to support agriculture. Most settlements are concentrated in oases along the Saoura valley and its tributaries. An aquifer under the Erg Er Raoui supports the main exception, Tabelbala. 

Natural resources include copper in the south in Djebel Ben Tagine.

History
The oases' traditional economic basis was agriculture, notably growing date palms and grain. The inhabitants of Igli speak Berber, and those of Tabelbala a Songhay language, Korandje; elsewhere, Arabic is spoken. A notable zaouia (traditional religious school) is found at Kerzaz. The region also supported a substantial mainly Arab pastoralist nomadic population, notably the Ghenanma, Chaamba, and Reguibat; some of these still remain nomadic, but most have settled in the oases. Trans-Saharan trade routes passing through this region played an important role in its economy in pre-modern times, but have at present been superseded.

Administrative divisions
The province is made up of 6 districts and 10 municipalities.

The districts are:

 Béni Abbès
 Kerzaz
 El Ouata
 Tabelbala
 Ouled Khodeïr
 Igli

The municipalities are:

 Beni Abbes
 Beni Ikhlef
 El Ouata
 Igli
 Kerzaz
 Ksabi
 Ouled Khoudir
 Tabelbala
 Tamtert
 Timoudi

History 
The wilaya of Béni Abbès was created on November 26, 2019 .

Previously, it was a delegated wilaya, created according to the law n° 15–140 of May 27, 2015, creating administrative districts in certain wilayas and fixing the specific rules related to them, as well as the list of municipalities that are attached to it. Before 2019, it was attached to the Bechar Province.

Organization of the wilaya 
During the administrative breakdown of 2015, the delegated wilaya of Béni Abbès is made up of 10 communes and 3 Districts

List of walis

References 

 
Provinces of Algeria
Sahara
States and territories established in 2019